The 2006 season of the Polish American Football League (PLFA) was the 1st season played by the major american football league in Poland. Regular season play was held from October 8 to November 5, 2006. The Polish champion title was eventually won by the Warsaw Eagles when they defeated the Pomorze Seahawks; the Polish Bowl championship game, at Marymont stadium in Warsaw, Masovian Voivodeship on November 12.

Regular season

Results table

Standings

Postseason

Third place match 
Third placed team after the regular season, The Crew Wrocław, did not participate in match due to financial reasons. After a walkover, third place was won by Fireballs Wielkopolska.

Polish Bowl I

See also 
 2006 in sports

References

External links 
 Polish American Football Association

Polish American Football League seasons
Poland
PLFA, 2006